The 2009 Colorado Rapids season was the fourteenth season of the team's existence. It began on March 21 with a 2-1 loss at Chivas USA and ended on October 24 with a 3-0 loss to Real Salt Lake. The result put RSL in the playoffs as the 8th seed and kept Colorado out on goal differential.

Squad

First-team squad
As of June 20, 2009.

Statistics

Club

Management

Other information

Competitions

Overall

Major League Soccer

Standings

Results summary

Matches

MLS

March

April

May

June

July

August

September

October

U.S. Open Cup qualification

References

External links 
2009 Schedule

2009
Colorado Rapids
Colorado Rapids
Colorado Rapids